RAB3A-interacting protein is a protein that in humans is encoded by the RAB3IP gene.

References

Further reading

External links